Hot Leg were an English rock band led by The Darkness frontman Justin Hawkins. The band consisted of Hawkins, Pete Rinaldi (of Anchorhead), Samuel SJ Stokes (formerly of The Thieves) and Darby Todd (from Protect the Beat). Their debut album Red Light Fever was recorded in London in early 2008, and was released on 9 February 2009 by Barbecue Rock Records.

Career
Hot Leg released the song "Heroes" as a free download, but the track did not appear on their album, Red Light Fever.  Appearing on their official Myspace profile was Hot Leg's debut single, titled "Trojan Guitar", which was released digitally as a free download on 20 October 2008. A medley of other songs due to appear on Red Light Fever were posted on the band's Myspace page, titled "Mega Mix 1". "Automatic" and "Cupboard Love" (additional tracks from the "I've Met Jesus" EP) were also posted. After the release of Red Light Fever, tracks from the album were uploaded.

Hot Leg conducted their first full tour of the United Kingdom in October 2008. During this tour, notably the band's Edinburgh date, Hawkins mentioned the band had a Christmas single entitled "I've Met Jesus", an unlikely contender for the UK Christmas number-one. Via their MySpace blog on 21 December 2008, the Leg announced that "I've Met Jesus" had hit the Christmas number-one slot in the "Man Rock" charts.

In November, Hot Leg toured the UK in support of Alter Bridge but pulled out of three dates giving Hawkins's throat infection as the reason.  Hot Leg also toured in November with Extreme. Hawkins and Rinaldi guested with Extreme on the final date in London, singing a medley of Queen songs. Hot Leg made a guest appearance on the Sky One programme, Guinness World Records Smashed, which aired on 27 November 2008.

In late February 2009, their song "Take Take Take" became available for download from their website, but did not feature on their debut album.

In late 2010, it was announced that Hot Leg were on hiatus, along with Stone Gods, which led to rumours of a possible The Darkness reunion in 2011.  This was confirmed on 15 March by an announcement on a new The Darkness website. Because of this the future of Hot Leg is unclear.

'Red Light Fever' was originally planned as a Justin Hawkins debut Solo album, with a tentative title of 'Panther', before Hot Leg were formed.

Discography
All chart positions are based on UK entries.

Albums

Singles

References

External links

 JustinHawkinsRocks.co.uk UK based fan site for Justin Hawkins and his projects – The Darkness, Hot Leg & British Whale (est. 2008)

English hard rock musical groups
English glam metal musical groups
Musical groups established in 2008